Ağaçpınar is a village in the Bitlis District of Bitlis Province in Turkey. The village is populated by Kurds of the Etmanekî tribe and had a population of 25 in 2021.

References

Villages in Bitlis District

Kurdish settlements in Bitlis Province